"On Fairy-Stories" is an essay by J. R. R. Tolkien which discusses the fairy story as a literary form. It was written as a lecture entitled "Fairy Stories" for the Andrew Lang lecture at the University of St Andrews, Scotland, on 8 March 1939.

The essay is significant because it contains Tolkien's explanation of his philosophy on fantasy and thoughts on mythopoeia. Moreover, the essay is an early analysis of speculative fiction by one of the most important authors in the genre. Alongside his 1936 essay "Beowulf: The Monsters and the Critics", it is his most influential scholarly work.

Literary context 
J. R. R. Tolkien was a professional philologist as well as an author of fiction, starting with the children's book The Hobbit in 1937; he had not intended to write a sequel. The Andrew Lang Lecture was important as it brought him to clarify for himself his view of fairy stories as a legitimate literary genre, rather than something intended exclusively for children. By the time of the lecture, The Hobbit had become extremely popular, and Tolkien had started work on a sequel.

Tolkien was among the pioneers of the genre now called fantasy. His stories – together with those of C. S. Lewis – were among the first to establish the convention of an alternative world or universe as the setting for speculative fiction. Most earlier works of fantastic fiction, such as the science fiction of H. G. Wells or the Gothic romances of Mary Shelley, were set in a world that is recognisably that of the author and introduced only a single fantastic element – or at most a fantastic milieu within the author's world, as with H. P. Lovecraft or Robert E. Howard. Tolkien departed from this; his work was nominally part of the history of our own world, but did not have the close linkage to history or contemporary times that his precursors had.

History 

Tolkien created the material as a lecture entitled "Fairy Stories"; he delivered it as the Andrew Lang lecture at the University of St Andrews, Scotland, on 8 March 1939. 

"On Fairy-Stories" first appeared in print, with some enhancement, in 1947, in a festschrift volume, Essays Presented to Charles Williams, compiled by C. S. Lewis. Charles Williams, a friend of Lewis's, had been relocated with the Oxford University Press staff from London to Oxford during the London blitz in World War II. This allowed him to participate in gatherings of the Inklings with Lewis and Tolkien. The volume of essays was intended to be presented to Williams upon the return of the Oxford University Press staff to London with the ending of the war. However, Williams died suddenly on 15 May 1945, and the book was published as a memorial volume. Essays Presented to Charles Williams received little attention, and was out of print by 1955.

"On Fairy-Stories" began to receive much more attention in 1964, when it was published in Tree and Leaf. Since then Tree and Leaf has been reprinted several times, and "On Fairy-Stories" has been reprinted in other compilations of Tolkien's works, such as The Tolkien Reader in 1966, though that edition was impaired by poor proofreading.
It appeared again in the 1980 Poems and Stories, and in the 1983 The Monsters and the Critics, and Other Essays. "On Fairy Stories" was published on its own in an expanded edition in 2008.

Synopsis 

In the lecture, Tolkien chose to focus on Andrew Lang’s work as a folklorist and collector of fairy tales. He disagreed with Lang's broad inclusion in his Fairy Books collection (1889–1910), of traveller's tales, beast fables, and other types of stories. Tolkien held a narrower perspective, viewing fairy stories as those that took place in Faerie, an enchanted realm, with or without fairies as characters. He disagreed with both Lang and Max Müller in their respective theories of the development of fairy stories, which he viewed as the natural development of the interaction of human imagination and human language.

The essay "On Fairy-Stories" is an attempt to explain and defend the genre of fairy tales or Märchen. It distinguishes Märchen from "traveller's tales" (such as Gulliver's Travels), science fiction (such as H. G. Wells's The Time Machine), beast tales (such as Aesop's Fables and Peter Rabbit), and dream stories (such as Alice in Wonderland). In the essay, Tolkien claims that one touchstone of the authentic fairy tale is that it is presented as wholly credible: "It is at any rate essential to a genuine fairy-story, as distinct from the employment of this form for lesser or debased purposes, that it should be presented as 'true'. ... But since the fairy-story deals with 'marvels', it cannot tolerate any frame or machinery suggesting that the whole framework in which they occur is a figment or illusion."

Tolkien emphasises that through the use of fantasy, which he equates with imagination, the author can bring the reader to experience a world that is consistent and rational, under rules other than those of the normal world. He calls this "a rare achievement of Art," and notes that it was important to him as a reader: "It was in fairy-stories that I first divined the potency of the words, and the wonder of things, such as stone, and wood, and iron; tree and grass; house and fire; bread and wine."

Tolkien suggests that fairy stories allow the reader to review his own world from the "perspective" of a different world. Tolkien calls this "recovery", in the sense that one's unquestioned assumptions might be recovered and changed by an outside perspective. Second, he defends fairy stories as offering escapist pleasure to the reader, justifying this analogy: a prisoner is not obliged to think of nothing but cells and wardens. And third, Tolkien suggests that fairy stories can provide moral or emotional consolation, through their happy ending, which he terms a "eucatastrophe".

In conclusion and as expanded upon in an epilogue, Tolkien asserts that a truly good and representative fairy story is marked by joy: "Far more powerful and poignant is the effect [of joy] in a serious tale of Faërie. In such stories, when the sudden 'turn' comes we get a piercing glimpse of joy, and heart's desire, that for a moment passes outside the frame, rends indeed the very web of story, and lets a gleam come through." Tolkien sees Christianity as partaking in and fulfilling the overarching mythological nature of the cosmos: "I would venture to say that approaching the Christian Story from this direction, it has long been my feeling (a joyous feeling) that God redeemed the corrupt making-creatures, men, in a way fitting to this aspect, as to others, of their strange nature. The Gospels contain a fairy-story, or a story of a larger kind which embraces all the essence of fairy-stories. They contain many marvels ... and among the marvels is the greatest and most complete conceivable eucatastrophe. The Birth of Christ is the eucatastrophe of Man's history. The Resurrection is the eucatastrophe of the story of the Incarnation."

Analysis 

The Tolkien scholar Verlyn Flieger stated that "On Fairy-Stories" would be at the centre of Tolkien research simply because it is Tolkien's own explanation of his art, of the "sub-creation" (in his terminology) of a secondary world. She at once adds that it is much more than that, since it is "a deeply perceptive commentary on the interdependence of language and human consciousness", a useful summary of the study of folklore at that time, and a "cogent" analysis of myth, fairy-story, and "the poet's craft". It is also, she writes, an essential text for study of "the multivalent myth, epic and fairy tale romance that is The Lord of the Rings." In her view,  alongside his 1936 essay "Beowulf: The Monsters and the Critics", the essay is his most influential scholarly work.

The folklorist Juliette Wood, writing in A Companion to J. R. R. Tolkien, comments that the image of Galadriel's creating her magic mirror by pouring water illustrated how central the "imaginative reworking of reality" was to the theory of fantasy that Tolkien set out in the essay. Carl Phelpstead, also writing in the Companion, notes that the essay attempts to answer three questions, namely what fairy-tales are, their origins, and their value, the last of these related to Tolkien's concept of mythopoeia.

Clyde Northrup argues that through the essay Tolkien creates a framework of four necessary qualities for interpreting "Tolkienian fantasy", or as he called it "fairy-story". These are fantasy (the contrast of enchantment and ordinariness), recovery (as the reader sees the "magic" of simple things in daily life), escape (from the primary world), and consolation (the "happy ending"). He suggests that these can be applied both to Tolkien's own Middle-earth fantasies, The Hobbit and The Lord of the Rings, and to the works of later fantasy authors including David Eddings, Roger Zelazny, Stephen R. Donaldson, and J. K. Rowling.

References to other works 

In his essay, Tolkien cites a wide variety of fiction, mythology, and academic works. The fiction and mythology include:

 A Midsummer Night's Dream by William Shakespeare
Aesop's Fables
 Alice in Wonderland by Lewis Carroll (1865)
 Arabian Nights
Arthur
 Baron Munchausen's Narrative of his Marvellous Travels by Rudolf Raspe (1785)
 Beauty and the Beast
 Beowulf
 Brer Rabbit
 Brut by Layamon (c.1200)
Celtic mythology
 Cinderella
 Confessio Amantis by John Gower (1390)
 Eros and Psyche
Greek mythology
 Grimm's Fairy Tales (1812)
 Gulliver's Travels by Jonathan Swift (1726)
 Humpty-Dumpty
Ingeld
Jason and Medea
 King Lear by William Shakespeare
 Little Red Riding Hood
 Macbeth by William Shakespeare
Mooreeffoc
Norse mythology
 Nymphidia by Michael Drayton (1627)
Olympus
 Peter Pan by J. M. Barrie (1904), and his lesser-known play Mary Rose (1920)
 Peter Rabbit by Beatrix Potter (1901–1902)
 Puss-in-Boots
 Reynard the Fox
 Sir Gawain and the Green Knight (late 1300s)
 Tales of Mother Goose by Charles Perrault (1697)
 The Ballad of Thomas the Rhymer
 The Battle of the Birds
 The Black Bull of Norroway
 The Blue Bird by Maeterlinck (1908)
The Coloured Fairy Books by Andrew Lang (1889-1910)
 The Faerie Queene by Edmund Spenser (1590)
 The First Men in the Moon by H. G. Wells (1900–01)
 The Frog King
 The Golden Key by George MacDonald (1867)
 The Monkey's Heart (originally from Swahili tradition)
 The Nun's Priest's Tale by Geoffrey Chaucer (fl. c.1343-1400)
 The Rose and the Ring by William Thackeray (1854)
 The Tale of Two Brothers of ancient Egypt
 The Three Little Pigs
 The Time Machine by H. G. Wells (1895)
 The Wind in the Willows by Kenneth Grahame (1908)
 Thrymskvitha of the Elder Edda
 Toad of Toad Hall by A. A. Milne (1929)
 Treasure Island by Robert Louis Stevenson (1883)

Tolkien also quotes from his own poem Mythopoeia.

References

Sources 
 

Essays by J. R. R. Tolkien
1939 essays
Essays in literary criticism
Works about fairy tales